Gloucester, New Jersey may refer to:
 Gloucester City, New Jersey, Camden County
 Gloucester Township, New Jersey, Camden County
 Gloucester County, New Jersey